Nicola A. Montani, KCSS (6 November 1880 Utica – 11 January 1948 Philadelphia) was a conductor, composer, arranger, and publisher of sacred music.
Montani founded  the St. Gregory Guild and the Society of St. Gregory.  In 1920, he published the famous St. Gregory Hymnal and Catholic Choir Book, containing mainly his own editions and compositions, similar to Oreste Ravanello's work.

He was a Knight Commander of St. Sylvester.

Publication
"Essentials in Sight Singing" - a modern method of Selfeggio, Book I, Parts One and Two of the Complete Work Fundamentals. Published by the C.C. Birchard & Company in Boston. ©1931, printed October 1936. Foreword by J. Lewis Browne.

References

 Adoramus Bulletin: Online Edition, June 2004, Volume X, Number 4: Hymns, Hymnals, Composers and Choir schools: Philadelphia's Historic Contributions to Catholic Liturgical Music

External links
 
 
 

American performers of Christian music
American male composers
American composers
1880 births
1948 deaths
Composers awarded knighthoods
Conductors (music) awarded knighthoods
20th-century conductors (music)
20th-century American male musicians